No. 302 (City of Poznan) Polish Fighter Squadron RAF was a Polish fighter squadron formed in Great Britain as part of an agreement between the Polish Government in Exile and the United Kingdom in 1940. It was one of several Polish fighter squadrons fighting alongside the Royal Air Force during World War II.

History
The squadron inherited the traditions, along with the emblem and a large part of the initial crew, of the pre-war Polish III/3 Fighter Squadron composed of the 131st and 132nd Fighter Escadrilles.

The Squadron was one of the four Polish-cored Royal Air Force squadrons that participated in the Battle of Britain. It consisted mostly of Polish pilots, many of whom were veterans. The backbone of the squadron was formed by 13 pilots who served with the I/145 Polish Fighter Squadron and were evacuated from France during the last stages of the German invasion of France.

The squadron was formed on 10 July 1940, equipped with Hawker Hurricanes the squadron was part of No. 12 Group RAF. As the combat became more fierce, the 302 was moved to RAF Duxford, north of London. The squadron operated from there as part of the Duxford Wing, 12 Group's 'Big Wing' formation, from 14 September through 25 September.
Having enjoyed some success on East Coast patrols following the Battle of Britiain, No. 302 Squadron re-located to RAF Jurby, Isle of Man, where they commenced night flying training and low level work.
At some point afterwards the squadron operated from Chailey. On 11 June 1944, 302 became the first Polish Squadron to land in France, five days after D-Day. It was fighting as part of No. 131 Polish Fighter Wing when its airfield was attacked by Jagdgeschwader 1 during Operation Bodenplatte in January 1945.

No.  302 Polish Squadron lost 20 pilots killed, 12 missing and 9 taken prisoners, 63 aircraft destroyed and 43 damaged by the enemy's air defence.

It was disbanded on 18 December 1946, at RAF Hethel. A replica Hurricane in 302 squadron markings was the gate guardian at the Imperial War Museum Duxford until it was repainted in 242 squadron markings in Feb 2018.

Commanders
 overall general command (British) 13 July 1940 - Squadron Leader William A. J. Satchell
 1 January 1941 S/Ldr (kpt.) Piotr Łaguna
 13 July 1940 - S/Ldr (mjr) Mieczysław Mümler
 7 December 1940 - S/Ldr (kpt.) Piotr Łaguna
 19 May 1941 - F/Lt (kpt.) (15 June 1941 - Acting S/Ldr) Stefan Witorzeńć
 28 November 1941 - S/Ldr (kpt.) Julian Kowalski
 25 August 1942 - S/Ldr (kpt.) Stanisław Łapka
 16 May 1943 - S/Ldr (kpt.) Wieczysław Barański
 18 October 1943 - S/Ldr (kpt.) Wacław Król
 7 July 1944 - S/Ldr (kpt.) Marian Duryasz
 30 January 1945 - S/Ldr (kpt.) Zygmunt Bieńkowski
 24 February 1945 - S/Ldr (kpt.) Ignacy Olszewski
 24 March 1945 - S/Ldr (kpt.) Bolesław Kaczmarek
 1 August 1945 - S/Ldr (kpt.) Jerzy Szymankiewicz (until disbanding)

Aircraft operated

See also
List of Royal Air Force aircraft squadrons
Polish Air Forces in Great Britain
Polish contribution to World War II

References

Notes

Bibliography

 Cynk, Jerzy B. The Polish Air Force at War: The Official History, 1939-1943. Atglen, PA: Schiffer Publishing, 1998. .
 Cynk, Jerzy B. The Polish Air Force at War: The Official History, 1943-1945. Atglen, PA: Schiffer Publishing, 1998. .
 Gretzyngier, Robert. Poles in Defence of Britain: A Day-by-Day Chronology of Polish Day and Night Fighter Operations, July 1940 - June 1941. London: Grub Street, 2001. .
 Gretzyngier, Robert. Polskie Skrzydła 4: Hawker Hurricane, część 1 (in Polish). Sandomierz, Poland: Stratus, 2005. .
 Halley, James J. The Squadrons of the Royal Air Force & Commonwealth, 1918 -1988. Tonbridge, Kent, UK: Air Britain (Historians) Ltd., 1988. .
 Jefford, C.G. RAF Squadrons, A Comprehensive Record of the Movement and Equipment of all RAF Squadrons and their Antecedents since 1912. Shrewsbury, UK: Airlife Publishing, 1998 (Second edition 2001). .
 Lisiewcz, M. et al. Destiny Can Wait: The Polish Air Force in the Second World War. Nashville, Tennessee: Battery Press, 1988. .
 Rawlings, John D.R. Fighter Squadrons of the RAF and their Aircraft. London: Macdonald and Jane's (Publishers) Ltd., 1969 (new edition 1976, reprinted 1978). .
 Zamoyski, Adam. The Forgotten Few: The Polish Air Force in the Second World War. New York: Hippocrene Books Inc., 1995. .

External links

 
 Photo Gallery of 302 Squadron
 Personnel of the Polish Air Force in Great Britain 1940-1947

302
302
Military units and formations established in 1940
Military units and formations disestablished in 1947
Battle of Britain